Conus marielae, common name Mariel's cone, is a species of sea snail, a marine gastropod mollusk in the family Conidae, the cone snails and their allies.

Like all species within the genus Conus, these snails are predatory and venomous. They are capable of "stinging" humans, therefore live ones should be handled carefully or not at all.

Description
The size of the shell varies between 30 mm and 60 mm.

Distribution
This species occurs in the Pacific Ocean off the Marquesas, Tuamotus and the Marshall Islands.

References

 Filmer R.M. (2001). A Catalogue of Nomenclature and Taxonomy in the Living Conidae 1758–1998. Backhuys Publishers, Leiden. 388pp
 Tucker J.K. (2009). Recent cone species database. September 4, 2009 Edition
 Tucker J.K. & Tenorio M.J. (2009) Systematic classification of Recent and fossil conoidean gastropods. Hackenheim: Conchbooks. 296 pp. 
 Monteiro A. (2009) A new subspecies of Conus moluccensis Küster, 1838 (Mollusca: Gastropoda) from Tahiti. Visaya 2(5): 88–90. [September 2009]
 Limpalaër L. & Monnier E. (2012) Phasmoconus alexandrei (Gastropoda: Conidae), a new species from the western Pacific. Visaya 3(5): 21–27. [March 2012]
 Puillandre N., Duda T.F., Meyer C., Olivera B.M. & Bouchet P. (2015). One, four or 100 genera? A new classification of the cone snails. Journal of Molluscan Studies. 81: 1–23

External links
 The Conus Biodiversity website
 

marielae
Gastropods described in 1975